Husborne Crawley railway station served the village of Husborne Crawley, Bedfordshire, England from 1905 to 1941 on the Varsity line.

History 
The station opened on 30 October 1905 by the London and North Western Railway. The station was situated on the west side of Bedford Road. The Railway Magazine of December 1905 reports that the first service was planned to start on 1 November 1905 and a 1 December 1905 restart was planned. Along with the other halts on the Varsity line, the station was closed on 1 January 1917 as a wartime economy measure. It reopened on 5 May 1919 but closed again and to goods traffic on 5 May 1941.

References

External links 

Disused railway stations in Bedfordshire
Former London and North Western Railway stations
Railway stations in Great Britain opened in 1905
Railway stations in Great Britain closed in 1941
1905 establishments in England
1941 disestablishments in England